Boris Vadimovich Kondakov (born March 29, 1954) is a Russian specialist in literary criticism, philologist, Doctor of Philology, head of Russian literature department, Dean of philological faculty at Perm State National Research University (since 1998). He is a grandson of Vadim Alexandrovich Kondakov, Professor of Perm State University, and a brother of Igor Vadimovich Kondakov, a philosopher and culturologist. Also he is a leader of the school "Typological Regularities and Dialogue of Cultures in Russian Literature of the 19th to 21st Centuries".

Sources
 Personal Page of B. Kondakov at Perm State National Research University's Official Page. 
 Boris Kondakov's page at "Perm Culture Encyclopedia"
 List of B. Kondakov's publications in "Журнальный зал" online-magazine

References

1954 births
Russian philologists
Perm State University alumni
Academic staff of Perm State University
Living people